Fidan Hajiaga qizi Hajiyeva/Naylor, Azerbaijan opera singer, People's Artist of the Republic of Azerbaijan, mezzo-soprano, Soloist of the Azerbaijan National Academic Opera and Ballet Theatre.

Life
Fidan Hajiaga qizi Hajiyeva was born in Baku, Azerbaijan in 1976. In 1984 she entered the fortepiano class of the Bulbul Secondary Music School. After graduating school in 1994 she entered the faculty vocal of the Baku Music Academy named after Uzeyir Hajibeyli, becoming a student of Professor Huseyn Aliyev. In 1998 she received master classes for vocal art from the world-famous People’s Artist of Russian Federation Irina Arkhipova.

Fidan Hajiyeva married Philip Naylor from England in 2003; they have one daughter and two sons.

Career
Since 1996 Fidan Hajiyeva has been a leading vocalist at the Azerbaijan State Opera and Ballet Theatre, performing national and classical leading opera roles.

She became Baku’s youngest performer of the title role of Carmen in Georges Bizet’s Carmen opera. Her leading roles include many in Verdi’s operas: Amneris in Aida, Azuchena in Il trovatore, Maddalena in Rigoletto opera Flora in La traviata.

She also sings Rozini in Rossini’s opera The Barber of Seville and La Principessa in Suor Angelica by Maskeni. In Azerbaijani national opera she performs as the singing girl in Uzeyir Hajibeyli’s opera Koroglu, as Asiya in the operetta Arshin mal alan (The cloth peddlar) and as Gulush in the opera Sevil by Fikret Amirov.

In 2000 Fidan Hajiyeva represented the Republic of Azerbaijan in the Turksoy Festival in Turkey and in the same year joined the Mersin State Opera and Ballet Theatre where she performed Carmen in Mersin, Istanbul, Izmir and Ankara, together with the ancient Roman open air theatre at “Aspendos” near Antalya before an audience of 15,000 people. 

Italians delighted by Fidan’s voice invited her to study in the masterclass of the Italian mezzo-soprano Bernadette Manca di Nissa at the Academy of Chigiana, where she won first prize in the final international competition.

Fidan released her first album Jealously and Love in 2003, singing national and international songs in seven languages.

In 2004, Fidan became a master soloist in the Hazi Aslanov Song and Dance Ensemble of the Ministry of Defence of the Republic of Azerbaijan, regularly participating in concert programs on patriotic themes to soldiers stationed in the regions of Azerbaijan.

Fidan participated in the Azerbaijani delegation to the Expo 2005 World Fair in Nagoya, Japan, where she promoted the music of Azerbaijan and also delighted the local audience by singing a popular children’s song in Japanese.

Fidan’s representation of Azerbaijan continued in the following years. In 2006 she gave concert performances in Germany at the theatres of Stuttgart and Mainz with the Berlin Philharmonic accompanied by the Azerbaijan State Chamber Orchestra conducted by Teymur Goychayev, whilst in 2008 she participated in a concert in Kyiv with People's Artist of Ukraine Aleksandr Buretz, jointly organized by the Azerbaijan and Ukraine Ministries of Culture.

In 2010 she continued her vocal education with the world-famed Italian mezzo-soprano Bruna Baglioni, leading to a performance in Puccini's opera Suor Angelica at the summer festival held in the Montefiore Conca city, Italy in June 2011. Later that year she also performed  Carmen in the Turkish city of Samsun.

With increasing international recognition Fidan has been successful in attracting well-known musicians to Azerbaijan. In May 2011 she performed Aida in Baku with the State Opera House orchestra conducted by the Italian conductor Gianluca Marciano; just a month later Fidan organized a concert program in Baku together with the French tenor Jean-Francis Monvoisin.

Later that year Fidan joined a tour of Italy promoting Azerbaijani culture, performing in Venice, Turin and at Milan Conservatory. There she met the famous Italian conductor and the pianist Stefano Miceli, who in 2012 invited Fidan to the "Gran Gala" concert at the Donizetti Theatre, in Bergamo, Italy.

In March 2014 Fidan performed a solo concert Sounds of Spring at the King's Place theatre in London, with a unique blend of Azerbaijani and international music, followed just one month later by her first solo concert in Baku. This was entitled Sevgili Janan and was performed to a sell-out audience of 2,000 at the Heydar Aliyev Sarayi theatre.

In April 2015 she performed another solo concert at the Heydar Aliyev Sarayi in Baku entitled Bir bahar akhshami.

In 2015 Fidan Hajiyeva was given the rank of the lieutenant of Head Department of Internal Troops of the Ministry of Internal Affairs of the Republic of the Azerbaijan, again undertaking patriotic concert programs for internal soldiers of the Ministry.

In 2015, Fidan played the leading role of Gulchokhra in the operetta Arshin Mal Alan by Azerbaijan's great composer Uzeyir Hajibeyov for the first time, bringing new breath to the role by her high professionalism and magnificent ability.

In 2016 Fidan realized her dream of many years by opening her own Music Centre to share her experience of all types of music to a body of students both young and old.

On September 15, 2016, Fidan Haciyeva and Alasgar Aliyev had presented duet Veli and Telli. Prior to it, during summer that year, the duo had made a clip in which they sang in three languages: Azerbaijani, Russian, and English. The clip was directed by Jeyhun Karimov and Alex Anisenko, and was produced by Aziz Aliyev with operator of the clip being Nadir Mehdiyev and artist Narmina Valiyeva.

On December 20, 2016, Fidan represented Azerbaijan at the 7th international world forum in Minsk at the invitation of the National Academic Bolshoi Theatre of the Opera and the Ballet of Belarus, with famous vocalists from a number of countries invited to perform at a gala concert. Following her performance she was invited by National Academic Bolshoi Theatre of the Opera and the Ballet of Belarus to perform Carmen in Minsk in April 2017.

In 2018, Fidan had performed romances by Adila Huseyn-Zade at Azerbaijan State Philharmonic Hall, along with Saida Tagi-Zadeh and Aleksey Miltikh. In November that year, she sang at the Minsk International Christmas Opera Forum.

Awards
In 2006 Fidan was awarded the title of “Honoured Artist of the Republic of Azerbaijan” by the President of the Republic of Azerbaijan, together with a President’s stipend in the following years.

By order of President Ilham Aliyev, in March 2015 Fidan Hajiyeva was awarded the title "People's Artist of the Republic of Azerbaijan" for productive activity in the field of culture, which she received on the occasion of the International Women's Day, 8 March.

Concerts

References

1976 births
Living people
21st-century Azerbaijani women opera singers
Musicians from Baku